Inga Swenson (born December 29, 1932) is an American actress and singer. She appeared in multiple Broadway productions and received two Tony nominations. She also spent seven years portraying Gretchen Kraus in the ABC comedy series Benson.

Early years
Inga Swenson was born in Omaha, Nebraska, the only child of Geneva Pauline ( Seeger) and Axel Carl Richard "A.C.R." Swenson. She graduated from Omaha Central High School in 1950. While attending OCHS, as a junior, Swenson won the state title in the National Forensic League's speech contest and later, she won the NFL's national contest. As a high school senior she was considered the school's best vocalist and she was also the president of the Central High Players. She studied drama at Northwestern University under Alvina Krause, among others, and was a member of the Alpha Phi sorority.

Family
She married sound engineer Lowell Harris in 1953. The couple had two sons, one of whom predeceased his parents.

Career 
Early in her career, Swenson had supporting roles in the films Advise and Consent (1962) and The Miracle Worker (1962) in which she played Helen Keller's mother. Swenson is a trained lyric soprano and starred on Broadway in New Faces (c. 1956), and The First Gentleman (1959), receiving Tony Award nominations for Best Actress in a Musical for her performances in 110 in the Shade (1964) and Baker Street (1965). A life member of The Actors Studio, she said her favorite role was Lizzie Currie in the musical 110 in the Shade.

Swenson appeared in two episodes of Bonanza: "Inger, My Love" (1962) and "Journey Remembered" (1963). She portrayed Gretchen Kraus, the autocratic and acerbic German cook (later head housekeeper and budget director) in the TV sitcom Benson. Her portrayal garnered three Emmy nominations. She was cast after appearing in a multi-episode stint as the conniving revenge-seeking Ingrid Svenson, the Swedish birth mother of Corinne Tate (Diana Canova), on the TV sitcom Soap.  (Benson was a spinoff of Soap and shared the same producers.) She also appeared as northern matriarch Maude Hazard in the mini-series North and South in 1985 and again in 1986. 

Swenson retired in 1998.

Stage credits
Stage debut – Maid, Peg O' My Heart, Berkshire Playhouse, Stockbridge, MA, 1949.
Broadway debut – Singer, New Faces of '56 (revue), Ethel Barrymore Theatre, 1956.
London debut – Lizzie Currie, 110 in the Shade, Palace Theatre, 1967.

Principal stage appearances
 Princess Alexandria, The Swan, Minnie Fay, The Merchant of Yonkers, singer, Sing Out, Sweet Land, and extra, Othello, all Playhouse Theatre, Eagles Mere, Pennsylvania, 1952.
 Aunt Anna Rose, Treasure Hunt, Monica, The Medium, Lucy, The Telephone, Dunyasha, The Cherry Orchard, Alizon Elliot, The Lady's Not for Burning, and Isabelle, Ring 'round the Moon, all Playhouse Theatre, Eagles Mere, Pennsylvania, 1953.
 Georgie Elgin, The Country Girl, Celia Copplestone, The Cocktail Party, Mrs. Larue, Mrs. McThing, Countess Aurelia, The Madwoman of Chaillot, and Angelique, The Imaginary Invalid, all Playhouse Theatre, Eagles Mere, Pennsylvania, 1954.
 Olivia, Twelfth Night, Jan Hus Playhouse, New York City, 1954.
 Princess Charlotte, The First Gentleman, Belasco Theatre, New York City, 1957.
 Madge, Picnic, and Amy Kittridge, A Swim in the Sea, both Royal Poinciana Playhouse, Palm Beach, FL, 1958.
 Ophelia, Hamlet, Helena, A Midsummer Night's Dream, and Perdita, The Winter's Tale, all American Shakespeare Festival, Stratford, CT, 1958.
 Amy Kittridge, A Swim in the Sea, Walnut Street Theatre, Philadelphia, PA, 1958.
 Juliet, Romeo and Juliet, American Shakespeare Festival, 1959.
 Solveig, Peer Gynt, Phoenix Theatre, New York City, 1960.
 Julie Jordan, Carousel, Melody Top Theatre, Hillside, IL, 1962.
 Gillian, Bell, Book, and Candle, Kiamesha Playhouse, Kiamesha Lake, New York, 1962.
 Desdemona, Othello, Arena Stage, Washington, DC, 1963.
 Magnolia, Show Boat, Kenley Players, Warren, OH, then Columbus, OH, both 1963.
 Lizzie Currie, 110 in the Shade, Broadhurst Theatre, New York City, 1963.
 Irene Adler, Baker Street, Broadway Theatre, New York City, 1965.
 title role, Mary Stuart, Parker Playhouse, Ft. Lauderdale, FL, 1967.
 Eliza Doolittle, My Fair Lady, City Center Light Opera Company, City center theater, New York City, 1968.
 Lady Alice More, A Man for All Seasons, Center Theatre Group, Ahmanson Theatre, Los Angeles, 1979.
 The Crucible, Center Theatre Group, Ahmanson Theatre, 1972
 The Four Poster, New Stage Theatre, Jackson, MS, 1979.

Major theatrical tours
 Marie Louise, My Three Angels, U.S. cities, 1957.
 Julie Jordan, Carousel, U.S. cities, 1960.
 Lizzie Currie, 110 in the Shade, U.S. cities, 1963

Movie credits
 Ellen Anderson, Advise and Consent, Columbia, 1962
 Kate Keller, The Miracle Worker, United Artists, 1962
 Sister Monica, Lipstick, Paramount, 1976
 Mrs. Craddock, The Betsy, Allied Artists, 1978
 Singer, The Mountain Men, Columbia, 1980

Television credits
Television debut – Singer, Chrysler Special, CBC (Canadian television), 1957.

Television series
 Gretchen Kraus, Benson, ABC, 1979–86.

Television mini-series
 Amelia Foster, Testimony of Two Men, syndicated, 1977.
 Maude Hazard, North and South, ABC, 1985.
 Maude Hazard, North and South, Book II, ABC, 1986.
 Marilyn Bradshaw Reagan, Nutcracker: Money, Madness, and Murder, NBC, 1987.

Television episodes
 Liza, "The Best Wine", Goodyear Playhouse, NBC, 1957
 Marjorie, "The World of Nick Adams", The Seven Lively Arts, CBS, 1957
 Maria, "Heart of Darkness", Playhouse 90, CBS, 1958
 Milly Theale, "Wings of the Dove", Playhouse 90, CBS, 1958
 Vera, "Goodbye, But It Doesn't Go Away", U.S. Steel Hour, CBS, 1958
 Rose Maylie, "Oliver Twist", DuPont Show of the Month, CBS, 1959
 Lady Jane, "Victoria Regina", Hallmark Hall of Fame, NBC, 1961
 Inger Borgstrom Cartwright, "Inger, My Love" and "Journey Remembered", Bonanza, NBC, 1962
 Henrietta Higgins, "The Sod House Woman", Sara, CBS, 1976
 Marie Barrett, "Hitchhike To Terror", Barnaby Jones, CBS, 1978 
 Ingrid Swenson, Soap, 1978, 1979
 Helen's mother, "Sex & Violence" (unaired), Highcliffe Manor, NBC, 1979
 Sonya Green, Hotel, ABC, 1988
 Holly Lindstrom, The Golden Girls, NBC, 1989
 Madelyn Stone, Newhart, CBS, 1989.

Other television
 The Defenders, CBS, 1961 and 1962
 Dr. Kildare, NBC, 1962
 Bonanza, NBC, 1963
 The Nurses, CBS, 1963
 American Musical Theatre, CBS, 1964
 The Tonight Show, NBC, 1964
 My Father and My Mother, CBS Playhouse, CBS, 1968
 Medical Center, CBS, 1970 and 1971
 The Tape Recorder, NET Playhouse, PBS, 1970

Television movies
 Ilyana Kovalefskii, Earth II, ABC, 1971.
 Nora Bayes, Ziegfeld: The Man and His Women, NBC, 1978.
 Matty Kline, Bay Cove, NBC, 1987.

Television specials
 Lavinia, Androcles and the Lion, NBC, 1967.
 Mrs. Trimble, My Dear Uncle Sherlock, ABC Short Story Specials, ABC, 1977.
 Mrs. Marston, The Terrible Secret. ABC Afterschool Special, ABC, 1979.
 Kate, The Gay Deceivers, CBC, 1956.

Notes

References

External links

 
 

1932 births
Living people
20th-century American actresses
Actresses from Omaha, Nebraska
American stage actresses
American film actresses
American television actresses
Northwestern University alumni
Omaha Central High School alumni